Ekenedirichukwu Ijemba (born May 14, 1991), better known by his stage name Humblesmith, is a Nigerian afropop recording artist who achieved recognition upon the release of his hit single titled "Osinachi". In 2015 which later won a nomination spot at the 2016 Nigeria Entertainment Awards.  He first ventured into the entertainment business as an actor, starring in a number of films including Hypertension (2010) with Sam Loco Efe. Currently signed to Show Bobo Music Limited, he made the list of "10 Artists To Watch in 2016" by notJustOk.

Early life
Originally from Uruala, a town in Ideato North local government area of Imo State, southeastern Nigeria, Ekene Ijemba was born on May 14, 1991 into a Catholic family in Abakaliki, Ebonyi State, Nigeria. While in secondary school, he started dancing and was part of a group called American Boys before he left Ebonyi State for Asaba City, the capital of Delta State, South-Southern Nigeria in order to pursue a career in music.

Career

2014–2017: Beginnings and rise to fame
Upon arriving in Asaba City, Humblesmith had to take up menial jobs in order to earn a living. He later ventured into entertainment as an actor and appeared in various films including Hypertension with Sam Loco Efe. He returned to Ebonyi State at some point and then back to Delta State again to focus on a career in music. Determined to succeed, he started scouting for shows and performed for free until he was signed by DG Records who were impressed with one of his several performances. In 2012, he left Asaba City for Lagos State where he recorded his debut single "Chairmoo" in 2014. In 2015, he released "Osinachi, a chart-topping single that featured Phyno; and Davido in the remix version. The song earned him a nomination spot in the "Best New Act" category at the 2016 edition of the Nigeria Entertainment Awards and was also nominated in the "Hottest Single" category at the same event. In April 2016, he featured Flavour N'abania in a song titled "Jukwese" which enjoyed rotational airplay around the country. He later announced an Instagram competition tagged the "#JukweseContest" in reference to the song, with a $2,000 prize money for the winner.

2018–present: Release of Osinachi, hiatus, and other singles
Following the success of his singles "Osinachi" and Jukwuese", Humblesmith released his debut album Osinachi, which featured guest vocals from Davido, Patoranking, Phyno, Harrysong, Olamide, and Tiwa Savage. In December 2020, after a brief hiatus, he released a new single, Kosi, loosely translated as "God's will", a song of gratitude to God for his achievements.

Artistry
Humblesmith cites Bright Chimezie as his music influence. He usually sings the afropop genre of music with a little fusion of highlife.

Endorsement deal
In June 2016, Humblesmith signed a multi-million Naira endorsement deal with noodles manufacturing company Tummy-Tummy Food Industry.

Discography

Awards and nominations

See also 
 List of Nigerian musicians

References

1991 births
Living people
People from Imo State
People from Delta State
Igbo highlife musicians
Igbo singers
Nigerian male singer-songwriters
Musicians from Abakaliki
21st-century Nigerian male  singers